Donato Carrisi (born 25 March 1973 in Martina Franca in Apulia) is an Italian writer, director and screenwriter.
He made his directorial debut with the film The Girl in the Fog (2017), based on his novel of the same name. He won a David di Donatello 2018 for Best New Director. It was one of the features of the 2019 Italian Film Festival in the United States, promoting Italian films in several cities.

Awards
 Premio Bancarella (2009)

Selected works
 The Whisperer (2009)
 The Girl in the Fog (2015)
 The Hunter of the Dark (2016)
 Into the Labyrinth (2017)

Filmography
 The Girl in the Fog (2017)
 Into the Labyrinth (2019)

External links

References

1973 births
Living people
Italian male screenwriters
Italian crime fiction writers
Thriller writers